Ghosts is a 1995 British television series that aired on the BBC1 between 21 January and 25 February 1995. The show is entirely ghost stories set in modern Britain.

Cast
Derrick O'Connor (Jack Rudkin) 
Anita Dobson (Suzi Rudkin) 
David Hayman (Les Rudkin) 
Paul Rhys (Captain Peter Buckle)
 Moira Brooker (Angela McClean)
Ian Shaw (Captain Alex McClean) 
Kevin McNally (Craig Byatt)   
Teresa Banham (Wendy Byatt)
Patricia Kerrigan (Judith Septon) 
 Tim Pigott-Smith (Dr. Evans)
 Cheryl Campbell (Mrs. Maradick) 
 Georgina Cates (Maureen) 
 Julia McKenzie (Mrs. Amberson)
 Douglas Henshall (Billy)
 Dan Mullane (John)   
Jacqueline Leonard (Sara) 
 Samantha Bond (Maddy)
Alan Cumming (Philip)
Jack Klaff (Trevor)
Louise Rea (Heloise)

Episodes

Reviews
In a retroactive review of Three Miles Up done in October 2014, the critic Leon Nicholson wrote: "Three Miles Up is more a psychological, ghostlike horror story rather than the blood, guts and gore that modern audiences are so used to. This is a slow, atmospheric burner. Due to this Three Miles Up will not be everyone’s cup of tea. It’s not perfect by any stretch of the imagination but if one can get hold of this episode it is worth a watch." In a retroactive review of The Shadowy Third in September 2016, the reviewer wrote: "The Shadowy Third has a deliciously spooky atmosphere and is genuinely chilling, all the more so for its understated period atmosphere and although you know where the story is going almost from the get go it still has the power to hold your interest." In another retroactive review of Three Miles Up done in March 2017, the critic Jon Dear wrote: "The conclusion when it comes feels sad and inevitable. Yet although this is a story where much is predictable, it’s what it makes you feel that is significant. You care about the brothers and their lives of lost moments and regret. You feel the loneliness of the little boat lost in the directionless waterways and featureless fenland."

Notes

External links
 
Ghosts
I'll Be Watching You 
Massage
Three Miles Up
The Chemistry Lesson
Blood and Water

1995 British television series debuts
1995 British television series endings
1990s British drama television series
1990s British horror television series
British supernatural television shows
1990s British crime television series
English-language television shows
Serial drama television series
1990s British television miniseries
British horror fiction television series
British fantasy television series
Television series about ghosts
Television shows set in the United Kingdom